Thiophene-2-carboxaldehyde is an organosulfur compound with the formula C4H3SCHO.  It is one of two isomeric thiophenecarboxaldehydes.  It is a colorless liquid that often appears amber after storage.  It is versatile precursor to many drugs including eprosartan, Azosemide, and Teniposide.

Preparation
It can be prepared from thiophene by the Vilsmeier reaction.  Alternatively, it is prepared from chloromethylation of thiophene.

References

Thiophenes
Aldehydes